Dmitri Valeryevich Khokhlov (born 22 December 1975) is a Russian football manager and a former player. He is an assistant coach with Sochi. He played as a holding midfielder or playmaker.

Playing career
Khokhlov played for PFC CSKA Moscow and FC Lokomotiv Moscow in native Russia, having abroad spells with Dutch club PSV Eindhoven and Spanish club Real Sociedad.

During his time with FC Lokomotiv Moscow he participated in their memorable 2003–04 UEFA Champions League campaign, scoring third goal in the 3–0 home victory against Internazionale.

He played for the Russia national team and was a participant at the 2002 FIFA World Cup.He became the winner Cyprus International Football Tournament 2003

Coaching career
Khokhlov won the youth championship with the Under-21 squad of FC Dynamo Moscow twice, in the 2013–14 and 2014–15 seasons.

He resigned as manager of FC Dynamo Moscow on 5 October 2019 following a string of losses and Dynamo in 15th place in the table.

On 28 May 2021, he was hired by the FNL club Rotor Volgograd. He left Rotor by mutual consent on 18 November 2021, with the club two points away from the relegation zone.

Personal life
His son Igor Khokhlov was also a professional footballer.

In 2022 he sued Facebook for banning his surname due to its association with the word khokhol, which is offensive to Ukrainians.

Career statistics

Club

International goals
Scores and results list Russia's goal tally first, score column indicates score after each Khokhlov goal.

Honours
Eredivisie champion, 2000
Johan Cruyff Shield Winner, 1998
Russian Premier League champion, 2004
Russian Super Cup winner, 2005

References

External links
 Dynamo Moscow profile 
 National team profile 
 
 www.psvweb.nl profile

Living people
1975 births
Sportspeople from Krasnodar
Russian footballers
Association football midfielders
Russia youth international footballers
Russia under-21 international footballers
Russia international footballers
UEFA Euro 1996 players
2002 FIFA World Cup players
PFC CSKA Moscow players
FC Torpedo Moscow players
PSV Eindhoven players
La Liga players
Real Sociedad footballers
FC Lokomotiv Moscow players
FC Dynamo Moscow players
Eredivisie players
Russian Premier League players
Russian football managers
FC Dynamo Moscow managers
Russian Premier League managers
FC Kuban Krasnodar managers
FC Rotor Volgograd managers
Russian expatriate footballers
Russian expatriate sportspeople in the Netherlands
Expatriate footballers in the Netherlands
Russian expatriate sportspeople in Spain
Expatriate footballers in Spain